Ducks Scéno (Stylized as dUCKS scéno) is a French company based in Villeurbanne specializing in scenography and museography.

History
Ducks Scéno was created in 1991 as a cooperative with 30 members, 22 of which are partners, who work as scenographers, mechanical engineers, audiovisual engineers, and architects.

Artistic concepts
Ducks Scéno strives to develop three concepts in particular in its work: asymmetry, natural light, and openness to the surrounding city.

Projects
The company has collaborated with renowned architects such as Jean Nouvel, Rem Koolhaas, and the architecture firm of Herzog & de Meuron.

Large-scale scenographic projects developed by Ducks Scéno include the Philharmonie de Paris, with Jean Nouvel; the Elbphilharmonie, with Swiss architects Herzog & de Meuron; the Casa da Música; the Taipei Performing Art Center with OMA; and the Fondation Louis-Vuitton, with Frank Gehry.

Notable works
Operas and theatres
 1992: Opéra Nouvel, with Jean Nouvel
 1997: Bâtiment des Forces motrices in Geneva, with Cattani and Picenni  
 2003: Amphithéâtre d'O in Montpellier, with King Kong 
 2003: Opéra de Lille, with AVA and Atelier P.L. Carlier 
 2006: Guthrie Theater in Minneapolis, with Jean Nouvel 
 2006: Theatre Claude Levi-Strauss in Musée du quai Branly in Paris, with Jean Nouvel
 2008: The Curve in Leicester, with Rafael Viñoly
 2011: Théâtre de l'Archipel in Perpignan, with Jean Nouvel and Brigitte Métra
 2011: Silo in Marseille, with C+T Architecture
 2013: Cultural Center of West New City, Jinan, with Paul Andreu
 2018: Oriental Movie Metropolis Grand Theater in Qingdao with Fuksas and IPPR
 2019: Maison de la Culture of Namur (Belgium) with Samyn & Partners

Concert halls
 2004: Casa da Música in Porto, with OMA
 2009: Koncerthuset in Copenhagen, with Jean Nouvel 
 2015: Philharmonie de Paris, with Jean Nouvel 
 2017: Elbe Philharmonic Hall, with Herzog & de Meuron 
 2017: La Seine Musicale of Ile Seguin, with Shigeru Ban

Auditoriums
 2005: Auditoriums of Museo Nacional Centro de Arte Reina Sofía in Madrid, with Jean Nouvel
 2005: Auditorium of Torre Agbar in Barcelona, with Jean Nouvel
 2006: Marseille City Hall, with Franck Hammoutène, laureate of the Prix de l'Équerre d'Argent in 2006 
 2011: Montpellier City Hall, with Jean Nouvel
 2011: Région Rhône-Alpes Headquarters, with Christian de Portzamparc
 2014: Fondation Louis-Vuitton, with Frank Gehry
 2017: Media Library in Caen, with OMA
 2019: Institut de France in Paris, with Marc Barani 

Musical venues
 1994: Zénith de Lille, with Office for Metropolitan Architecture
 2004: Maison folie Wazemmes in Lille, with Nox
 2006: La Commanderie in Dole (Jura), with Brigitte Métra 
 2007: Casino of Toulouse, with Wilmotte
 2008: Le Fil in Saint Étienne, with XXL 
 2010: Casino de Lille, with Jean-Paul Viguier
 2010: H106 in Rouen, with King Kong 
 2011: Astrada in Marciac, with King Kong
 2013: Métaphone in Oignies, with Hérault-Arnod 
 2014: Metronum in Toulouse, with Gouwy Grima Rames
 2014: The Flow in Lille, with King Kong 
 2015: Belle Électrique in Grenoble, with Hérault-Arnod 

Convention centres
 1993: Congress Center of Tours "Le Vinci", with Jean Nouvel 
 1994: Lille Grand Palais, with Office for Metropolitan Architecture
 2014: Nancy Congress Center, with Marc Barani
 2014: Exhibition Center of Agen, with Cardete & Huet
 2016: Le Carré des Docks in Le Havre, with Paul Andreu and Richez Associés 
 2019: Shenzhen International Convention and Exhibition Center (SZICEC) with Valode & Pistre and Aube Architects
 2020: Exhibition Centre of Toulouse, with OMA

Movie theatre
 1998: Institut Lumière in Lyon, with Pierre Colboc

Sports arenas
 2011: MMArena in Le Mans, with Cardete & Huet 
 2014: Brest Arena, with Hérault-Arnod

Museums and landscape spaces
 2000: Expo 2000 in Hanover, with Jean Nouvel
 2000: Parc des Oiseaux in Villars-les-Dombes, with Tectoniques
 2001: Expo 02 in Morat, with Jean Nouvel
 2008: TAG Heuer Museum in La Chaux-de-Fonds, with Carbondale
 2010: Museum of the Prehistory in Lussac-les-Châteaux, with Atelier Beaudoin et Engel
 2011: Lalique Museum in Wingen-sur-Moder, with Wilmotte
 2014: Astronomy Center in Vaulx-en-Velin, with S.F. Design
 2015: Prada Largo Isarco in Milan, with OMA 
 2017:Louvre Abu Dhabi, with Jean Nouvel
 2018: Danish Architecture Centre in Copenhagen, with OMA 
 2018: Lafayette Anticipations in Paris with OMA
 2018: Fondation Carmignac in Porquerolles with GMAA and Marc Barani Architects
 2019: Qatar National Museum with Jean Nouvel
 2019: MECA (Maison de l’Économie Créative et de la Culture en Aquitaine) in Bordeaux with Bjarke Ingels Group

Current projects 
Operas and theaters
 Taipei Performing Art Center in Taipei, with OMA
 Dance Theater in Dali with Zhu Pei
 Opera Bastille in Paris with Henning Larsen Architects

Concert halls
 Broadway O-Show Concert Hall and Theatre in Tianjin, with P&T Architects

Auditoriums
 Auditorium of Tour Duo in Paris, with Ateliers Jean Nouvel

Congress Center
 Congress Center of Royan, with Atelier Ferret
 The Brussels Pavilion Garden International Convention Center in Brussels with Ateliers Jean Nouvel

Museums
 Musée Albert-Kahn in Boulogne-Billancourt, with Kengo Kuma
 Pudong Art Museum in shanghai with Ateliers Jean Nouvel
 Bao'An Museum with Coldefy & Associates
 Museum of Italian Mint in Roma with Alfonso Femia Architects

Gallery

References

External links
 
 Conference at the Business of Design Week 2009 in Hong Kong

Design companies of France
Design companies established in 1991
Companies based in Lyon